Polyetherketoneketone (PEKK) is a semi-crystalline thermoplastic in the polyaryletherketone (PAEK) family of polymers. It possesses high heat, chemical, and mechanical load resistance. PEKK has a glass transition temperature (Tg) of 162 °C.

Applications 
Hexcel Corporation (Formerly Oxford Performance Materials) manufactures PEKK-based parts for Boeing for use in its Starliner space taxis, using 3D printing-based additive manufacturing. It has wide dental and medical applications. The parts are claimed to be as strong as aluminum while being 40 percent of the weight. In addition, PEKK manufactured components have shown fire and radiation resistant properties.

References

Organic polymers
Polyethers
Thermoplastics